Christ Church is a historic church in Quincy, Massachusetts. It is a parish of the Episcopal Diocese of Massachusetts.  The parish first congregated for lay-led services in 1689, and officially formed in 1704. It is believed to be the oldest continuously active Episcopal parish in Massachusetts.  The building is a Tudor Revival structure constructed in 1874; it was listed on the National Register of Historic Places in 1989.  The Rev. Clifford Brown is the current rector.

Description and history
Christ Church is set at the northeast corner of Quincy and Elm Streets, south of Quincy's central business district.  It is built out of local granite, with a steeply-pitched slate roof.  The front-facing gable houses a large arched stained glass window, and the side walls have modest buttressing.  Entry vestibules project to either side, in emulation of the English country churches its design recalls.  A significant deviation from that style is the lack of a rounded apse; instead, that section of the church has a flat wall.  A Tudor Revival parish house is attached to the rear.  It is also built out of local granite, with heavy stone window sills and lintels and steep ridged roof gables.

The parish was formally organized in 1704 by Rev. William Barclay, when the area was still part of Braintree, and built its first church on School Street in 1727 (at the site of the Christ Church Burial Ground.  It built a second frame church at the present site in 1832 and a stone one in 1859, both of which were destroyed by fire.  The present church was built in 1874, in an English Revival style that was then in vogue for Episcopal churches.

See also
Christ Church Burial Ground (Quincy, Massachusetts)
National Register of Historic Places listings in Quincy, Massachusetts

References

External links
Christ Church Quincy web site

Episcopal church buildings in Massachusetts
1704 establishments in Massachusetts
Churches on the National Register of Historic Places in Massachusetts
Churches completed in 1874
19th-century Episcopal church buildings
Churches in Quincy, Massachusetts
Stone churches in Massachusetts
National Register of Historic Places in Quincy, Massachusetts